Madam Fickle; Or, The Witty False One is a 1676 comedy play by the English writer Thomas D'Urfey. It was first staged at the Dorset Garden Theatre by the Duke's Company.

The original cast included Thomas Betterton as Lord Bellamore, William Smith as  Manley, Samuel Sandford as Sir Arthur Oldlove, Matthew Medbourne as Captain Tilbury, Anthony Leigh as Zechiel, James Nokes as Toby, Cave Underhill as Old Jollyman, Thomas Jevon as Harry, John Richards as Flaile, Henry Norris as Dorrel, Mary Lee as  Madam Fickle, Elizabeth Barry as Constantia and Anne Shadwell as Arbella. The published version of the play was dedicated to the Duke of Ormonde.

References

Bibliography
 Canfield, J. Douglas. Tricksters and Estates: On the Ideology of Restoration Comedy. University Press of Kentucky, 2014.
 Van Lennep, W. The London Stage, 1660-1800: Volume One, 1660-1700. Southern Illinois University Press, 1960.

1676 plays
West End plays
Plays by Thomas d'Urfey
Restoration comedy